The WAGR D class was a single member class of 0-4-0ST tank locomotive operated by the Western Australian Government Railways (WAGR) from 1884 until 1903.

History
The D class locomotive was built in 1884 by Hunslet Engine Company, Leeds. It entered service on 1 March 1884 as a jetty shunter on the Fremantle Long Jetty. When engine class designations were introduced in 1885, it was numbered D6.

Upon the opening of Fremantle's inner harbour in 1897, the long jetty ceased to be used, and the locomotive became surplus to requirements. It was sold in September 1903 for use on the 2.5 mile Leonora tramway. Following the electrification of that tramway in 1908, it was sold to Bunning Brothers, reboilered, had its saddle tank removed and a tender built hauled timber hauling times trains at Lyall Mill, Argyle, Muja and Tullis until withdrawn in 1951 and scrapped in 1956.

Namesakes
The D class designation was reused for the D class locomotives from 1912 and again in the 1970s when the D class diesel locomotives entered service.

See also

History of rail transport in Western Australia
List of Western Australian locomotive classes

References

Notes

Bibliography

External links

Hunslet locomotives
Railway locomotives introduced in 1884
D WAGR class (1884)
0-4-0ST locomotives
3 ft 6 in gauge locomotives of Australia
Shunting locomotives